The A.P. and anti-tire mine was a  British anti-personnel mine and anti-vehicle  mine used in World War II.

Design

Parts 
The mine's exterior is made up of two circular steel half. The bottom half is smaller than the top. The bottom half contains the detonater system which makes the mine blow up. The top half contains the actual explosive which is in the shape of a circle without the middle. The explosive is attached to the top half through some substance which holds it in place.

Detonation process 
The mine is triggered by pressure on top of it by something above  compressing the mine. This causes the detonater retainer to go down onto a cap retainer sleeve which coils the striker spring. This simultaneously making the striker go through shear wire. When the striker goes through the shear wire the force of the striker springs makes the striker go further and makes contact with a percussion cap. The flames made by the striker coming into contact with the percussion cap go through holes in the mine activating the two detonaters which in turn detonate the mines explosive contents.

Arming and disarming 
The mine is armed by putting the detonater retainer over the percussion cap retaining sleeve and screwing the percussion cap into the lower half of the mine. Then the larger upper half is placed on the smaller lower half. Disarming the mine involves doing the opposite of arming  and also there is no safety as that cannot be used to neutralise it the mine is basic.

Service 
This mine was intended to be used by airborne units. Its light charge means it is only capable of damaging tires on motor vehicles but it is sufficient to severely injure a soldier and possibly kill them and will definitely make anyone that steps on it a casualty.

See also 
 Mine diagram and images

References

Anti-personnel mines